Chaetostoma daidalmatos is a species of catfish in the family Loricariidae. It is native to South America, where it occurs in the Huallaga River basin in Peru. The species was described alongside the species Chaetostoma stroumpoulos in 2006 by Norma J. Salcedo of the College of Charleston on the basis of distinctive morphology and coloration.

References 

daidalmatos
Fish described in 2006